Barry Lee Levinson (born April 6, 1942) is an American filmmaker, comedian and actor. Levinson's best-known works are mid-budget comedy drama and drama films such as Diner (1982); The Natural (1984); Good Morning, Vietnam (1987); Bugsy (1991); and Wag the Dog (1997). He won the Academy Award for Best Director for Rain Man (1988). In 2021, he co-executive produced the Hulu miniseries Dopesick and directed the first two episodes.

Early life
Levinson is of Russian-Jewish descent. 

After growing up in Forest Park, Baltimore and graduating from Forest Park Senior High School in 1960, Levinson attended Baltimore City Community College and American University in Washington, D.C. at the American University School of Communication, where he studied broadcast journalism. 

He then moved to Los Angeles to work as an actor and writer and performed comedy routines. Levinson at one time shared an apartment with would-be drug smuggler (and subject of the movie Blow) George Jung.

Career
Levinson's first writing work was for variety shows such as The Marty Feldman Comedy Machine, The Lohman and Barkley Show, The Tim Conway Show, and The Carol Burnett Show. After some success as a screenwriter – notably the Mel Brooks comedies Silent Movie (1976) and High Anxiety (1977) (in which he played a bellboy) and the Oscar-nominated script (co-written by then-wife Valerie Curtin) ...And Justice for All (1979) – Levinson began his career as a film director.

His first directorial effort was Diner (1982), for which he also wrote the script, earned him an Oscar nomination for Best Original Screenplay. Diner was the first of four films set in the Baltimore of Levinson's youth. The other three were Tin Men (1987), a story of aluminum-siding salesmen in the 1960s starring Richard Dreyfuss and Danny DeVito; the immigrant family saga Avalon (1990) featuring Elijah Wood in one of his earliest screen appearances; and Liberty Heights (1999).

His biggest hit, both critically and financially, was Rain Man (1988), a sibling drama starring Dustin Hoffman and Tom Cruise in which Levinson appeared as a doctor in a cameo appearance. The film won four Academy Awards, including Best Picture and Best Director. It also won the Golden Bear at the 39th Berlin International Film Festival.

Levinson directed the popular period baseball drama The Natural (1984), starring Robert Redford. Redford would later direct Quiz Show (1994), and he cast Levinson as television personality Dave Garroway. Levinson also directed the classic war comedy Good Morning, Vietnam (1987), starring Robin Williams (as Adrian Cronauer), and he later collaborated with Williams on the fantasy film Toys (1992) and the political comedy Man of the Year (2006). Levinson also directed the critically acclaimed historical crime drama Bugsy (1991), which starred Warren Beatty and which was nominated for ten Academy Awards.

He directed Dustin Hoffman again in Wag the Dog (1997), a political comedy co-starring Robert De Niro about a war staged in a film studio. (Levinson had been an uncredited co-writer on Hoffman's 1982 hit comedy Tootsie.) The film won the Silver Bear – Special Jury Prize at the 48th Berlin International Film Festival.

Levinson partnered with producer Mark Johnson to form the film production company Baltimore Pictures, with 1990's Avalon as the company's first production. Johnson departed the firm in 1994. Levinson has been a producer or executive producer for such major productions as The Perfect Storm (2000), directed by Wolfgang Petersen; Analyze That (2002), starring De Niro as a neurotic mob boss and Billy Crystal as his therapist; and Possession (2002), based on the best-selling novel by A. S. Byatt.

Levinson has a television production company with Tom Fontana (The Levinson/Fontana Company) and has served as executive producer for a number of series, including Homicide: Life on the Street (which ran on NBC from 1993 to 1999) and the HBO prison drama Oz. Levinson also played an uncredited main role as a judge in the short-lived TV series The Jury.

Levinson published his first novel, Sixty-Six, in 2003, and like several of his films, it is semi-autobiographical and set in Baltimore in the 1960s. In 2004, he directed two webisodes of the American Express ads "The Adventures of Seinfeld & Superman." In 2004, he was also the recipient of the Austin Film Festival's Distinguished Screenwriter Award. Levinson directed a documentary PoliWood about the 2008 Democratic and Republican National Conventions: the documentary — produced by Tim Daly, Robin Bronk and Robert E. Baruc — had its premiere at the 2009 Tribeca Film Festival.

Levinson, in 2011, was developing a film based on Whitey Bulger, the Boston crime boss. The film Black Mass (script by Jim Sheridan, Jez Butterworth, and Russell Gewirtz) is based on the book by Dick Lehr and Gerard O'Neill, and it is said to be the "true story of Billy Bulger, Whitey Bulger, FBI agent John Connelly and the FBI's witness protection program created by J. Edgar Hoover." Levinson later left the project.

Levinson finished production on The Humbling (2014), starring Al Pacino. Levinson also directed Rock the Kasbah (2015), written by Mitch Glazer. The film starred Bill Murray, Bruce Willis, Kate Hudson, Zooey Deschanel, Leem Lubany, Scott Caan, Danny McBride, Kelly Lynch, Arian Moayed, Taylor Kinney, and Beejan Land.

In 2010 Levinson received the Laurel Award for Screenwriting Achievement, which is the lifetime achievement award from the Writers Guild of America.

Filmography

Awards and nominations

References

External links

Barry Levinson on Charlie Rose (March 24, 1994)

1942 births
Actors from Maryland
American film directors
American film producers
American male comedians
American male film actors
American male screenwriters
American people of Russian-Jewish descent
American television directors
American television producers
American television writers
American University School of Communication alumni
Baltimore City Community College alumni
Best Directing Academy Award winners
Businesspeople from Baltimore
Comedians from Maryland
Directors Guild of America Award winners
Directors of Golden Bear winners
English-language film directors
Film directors from Maryland
Golden Globe Award-winning producers
Jewish American writers
Jews and Judaism in Baltimore
Living people
Screenwriters from Maryland
Writers from Baltimore
Writers Guild of America Award winners
Comedy film directors
21st-century American Jews